Hercules is the Roman adaptation of the Greek mythological hero Heracles.

Hercules may also refer to:

Animals
 Hercules beetle
 Hercules (bear) (1975–2001), Scottish wrestling bear
 Hercules (liger), the world's largest living cat
 Hercules moth, of family Saturniidae
 Hercules parrot, an extinct giant parrot species from New Zealand

Arts and entertainment

Fictional characters
 Hercules (comics), various versions of the mythical hero in comics
 Hercules (Disney character)
 Hercules (TUGS), in the British children's television series TUGS
 Hercules Grytpype-Thynne, a character from the British 1950s comedy radio programme The Goon Show
 Hercules, a superhero in the 1970s Filmation animated cartoon Space Sentinels

Film
 Hercules (1958 film), starring Steve Reeves
 Hercules (1983 film), starring Lou Ferrigno
 The Adventures of Hercules (1985 film), sequel to the 1983 film
 Hercules (1997 film), a Disney animated film
 Hercules (2014 film), an action-adventure film starring Dwayne Johnson

Television
 Hercules: The Legendary Journeys, a 1995–1999 American syndicated action television series starring Kevin Sorbo
 Hercules (1998 TV series), based on the 1997 Disney film
 Hercules (miniseries), a 2005 American television miniseries that aired on NBC

Music
 Hercules (Handel), a music drama by George Frideric Handel
 "Hercules", a 1973 song by Aaron Neville
 "Hercules", a song by Midnight Oil from their 1985 EP Species Deceases
 Hercules (soundtrack), for the 1997 Disney film
 "Hercules", a song from Elton John's 1972 album Honky Château
 "Hercules", a song from George Watsky's 2009 album Watsky
 "Hercules", a song from Young Thug's 2016 mixtape I'm Up

Video games
 Hercules (1984 video game), for home computers
 Disney's Hercules (video game), 1997, based on the Disney film

Other arts and entertainment
 Hercules (franchise), a Disney media franchise
 Hercules (musical), 2019, based on the 1997 Disney film
 Hercules (Piero della Francesca), a 15th-century fresco
 Hercules (Seneca), a play

Astronomy
 Hercules (constellation), in the northern hemisphere
 Hercules (dwarf galaxy), near the Milky Way galaxy
 Hercules Superclusters
 Hercules Cluster
 Hercules (crater), a lunar impact crater

Businesses
 Hercules (Bulgarian company), a defunct maker of commercial vehicles
 Hercules (nightclub), Helsinki, Finland
 Hercules (vehicles), a Greek manufacturer of farm vehicles
 Hercules Computer Technology, a former computer peripheral manufacturer
 Hercules Cycle and Motor Company, a former British bicycle manufacturer
 Hercules Engine Company, in Canton, Ohio, US
 Hercules Gas Engine Company, in Cincinnati, Ohio, US
 Hercules Inc., a chemical company which merged with and became Ashland, Inc.

Military
 HMS Hercules, any of several Royal Navy ships
 Lockheed C-130 Hercules, an American military transport aircraft
 Bristol Hercules, a British aircraft engine
 Nike Hercules, a surface-to-air missile used by US and NATO armed forces
 M88 Hercules, a US Army armored battlefield recovery vehicle

People

Mononym or professional name 
 Hercules (gangster) (born 1960s), Indonesian crime boss
 Hercules (wrestler), WWF professional wrestler Ray Fernandez (1956–2004)
 Ruben Cruz (1950–2020), Puerto Rican professional wrestler known by his ring name, Hercules Ayala
 Richard Sandrak (born 1992), American bodybuilder known as Little Hercules

Given name 
 Hércules Brito Ruas (born 1939), Brazilian footballer known as Brito
 Hercules Brabazon Brabazon (1821–1906), English artist
 Hercules Burnett (1865–1936), Major League Baseball player
 Hércules de Miranda (1912–1982), Brazilian footballer
 Hércules Florence (1804–1879), French-Brazilian painter and inventor
 Hercules Huncks (died 1660), English soldier, one of the Regicides of King Charles I
 Hercules Kyvelos (born 1975), Canadian welterweight boxer
 Sir Hercules Langrishe, 1st Baronet (1729–1811), Irish politician
 Sir Hercules Langrishe, 5th Baronet (1859–1943), Irish soldier, sailor and yachtsman
 Hercules Linton (1836–1900), Scottish shipbuilder and designer
 Hercules Mata'afa (born 1995), American football player
 Hercules Mulligan, (1740–1825), tailor and spy for the patriot forces in the American Revolutionary War
 Hércules Pereira do Nascimento (born 2000), Brazilian footballer
 Hercules Posey (1748–1812), slave owned by George Washington
 Hercules Read (Charles Hercules Read, 1857–1929), British archaeologist and curator at the British Museum
 Hercules Robinson, 1st Baron Rosmead (1824–1897), the 5th governor of Hong Kong
 Hercules Ross (1745–1816), Scottish merchant involved in the campaign for the abolition of the slave trade
 Hercules Seghers (1589–1638), Dutch painter and printmaker
 Hercules Taylour (1759–1790), Irish soldier and politician

Surname 

 Kylie Hercules (born 1989), Saint Helena politician and official
 Olia Hercules (born 1984), London-based Ukrainian chef, food writer and food stylist

Places
 Hercules, California, a small town
 Hercules, Missouri, an unincorporated community
 Mount Hercules, Antarctica
 Port Hercules, Monaco

Teams
 Hércules (Salvadoran football club)
 Hércules CF, a football team based in Alicante, Spain
 JS Hercules, a football team based in Oulu, Finland
 USV Hercules, a football club based in Utrecht, Netherlands

Technology
 Nikon NASA F4, one of the first digital cameras, used by NASA as HERCULES
 Hercules (emulator), an IBM mainframe emulator
 Hercules (processors), a line of safety microcontrollers from Texas Instruments
 Hercules Graphics Card, and early graphics card for the IBM PC
 Hercules PSU, a power supply unit for audiophile turntables

Transportation
 de Havilland Hercules, 1920s British airliner and mailplane
 Fletcher Hercules, American ultralight trike aircraft
 Hercules (1872–1889), one of the ten South Devon Railway Buffalo class steam locomotives
 Hercules, one of the GWR 3031 Class locomotives run on the Great Western Railway between 1891 and 1915
 , various ships
 , several steamships
 Hercules (motorcycle), built by Sachs Motorcycles
 Hercules (locomotive), built in 1838 for the Beaver Meadow Railroad
 Hughes H-4 Hercules, better known as the "Spruce Goose", American 1940s prototype flying boat, the largest ever built
 Paladin Hercules, American powered parachute design
 Hercules Cycles, brand of bicycles produced by Tube Investments of India
 Hercules station, proposed train station and ferry terminal for Hercules, California

Other
 Judge Hercules, a metaphorical "ideal judge" posited by legal philosopher Ronald Dworkin
 Hercules (roller coaster), former structure in Allentown, Pennsylvania
 Hercules (tree), a giant sequoia in the Mountain Home Grove, California
 Winter Storm Hercules, designated by The Weather Channel in the United States in 2014
 Resupply Depot Hercules, an orbiting space station concept by Bigelow Aerospace
 Hercules silver mine, in the Coeur d'Alene Mountains, Idaho
 the "Hercules gene", a popular name for variants of the MSTN gene coding for myostatin

See also
 Pillars of Hercules, the promontories that flank the entrance to the Strait of Gibraltar
 Temple of Hercules (disambiguation)
 Farnese Hercules, an ancient sculpture made for the Baths of Caracalla in Rome
 Hercules the Archer, a 1909 sculpture by Antoine Bourdelle
 Herkules (disambiguation)
 Hercule (disambiguation)
 Ercole (disambiguation), Italian form of the name